Jesus College may refer to:
Jesus College, Cambridge
Jesus College, Oxford